Inge Nissen is a Danish basketball player and coach.  A 2012 inductee to the Women's Basketball Hall of Fame, Nissen was a star for the Danish national team and a college All-American at Old Dominion University.  After her playing career, Nissen became an assistant coach for long-time Florida International University coach Cindy Russo and was named interim head coach when Russo retired during the 2014–15 season.

Old Dominion University statistics
Source

Head coaching record

* Nissen became interim head coach on January 22, 2015 following the resignation of Cindy Russo. Their combined records for the 2014–15 season is 3–26 (0–18 C-USA).

References

External links
FIU bio
Women's Basketball HOF profile

Year of birth missing (living people)
Living people
All-American college women's basketball players
Centers (basketball)
Danish expatriate basketball people in the United States
Danish women's basketball coaches
Danish women's basketball players
FIU Panthers women's basketball coaches
Old Dominion Monarchs women's basketball players
Power forwards (basketball)
Women's Professional Basketball League players